Rosebud County is a county in the state of Montana. It was established February 11, 1901, and has Montana vehicle license plate prefix 29. As of the 2020 census, the population was 8,329. Its county seat is Forsyth.

Geography
It is the fourth-largest county in Montana by land area and fifth-largest by total area. Part of Custer National Forest is located in the county.

Climate

According to the Köppen Climate Classification system, most of Rosebud County has a cold semi-arid climate, abbreviated "BSk" on climate maps.

Demographics

2000 census
As of the 2000 United States census, there were 9,383 people, 3,307 households, and 2,417 families in the county. The population density was 2 people per square mile (1/km2). There were 3,912 housing units at an average density of 1 per square mile (0/km2).

The racial makeup of the county was 64.40% White, 0.23% Black or African American, 32.41% Native American, 0.29% Asian, 0.65% from other races, and 2.01% from two or more races. 2.33% of the population were Hispanic or Latino of any race. 19.8% were of German, 7.2% Irish, 7.1% English and 6.9% Norwegian ancestry. 87.6% spoke English, 8.3% Cheyenne, 1.9% Spanish and 1.0% German as their first language.

There were 3,307 households, out of which 38.70% had children under the age of 18 living with them, 56.00% were married couples living together, 11.80% had a female householder with no husband present, and 26.90% were non-families. 24.30% of all households were made up of individuals, and 8.40% had someone living alone who was 65 years of age or older. The average household size was 2.81 and the average family size was 3.34.

The county population contained 33.50% under the age of 18, 7.20% from 18 to 24, 25.70% from 25 to 44, 24.80% from 45 to 64, and 8.90% who were 65 years of age or older. The median age was 34 years. For every 100 females there were 100.90 males. For every 100 females age 18 and over, there were 99.20 males.

The median income for a household in the county was $35,898, and the median income for a family was $41,631. Males had a median income of $38,688 versus $20,640 for females. The per capita income for the county was $15,032. About 17.80% of families and 22.40% of the population were below the poverty line, including 31.80% of those under age 18 and 15.10% of those age 65 or over.

2010 census
As of the 2010 United States census, there were 9,233 people, 3,395 households, and 2,318 families residing in the county. The racial makeup of the county was 61.3% white, 34.7% American Indian, 0.5% Asian, 0.3% black or African American, 0.5% from other races, and 2.8% from two or more races. Those of Hispanic or Latino origin made up 3.4% of the population. In terms of ancestry, 25.0% were American, 19.0% were German, 6.9% were English, and 6.6% were Irish.

Of the 3,395 households, 36.4% had children under the age of 18 living with them, 51.3% were married couples living together, 10.6% had a female householder with no husband present, 31.7% were non-families, and 27.6% of all households were made up of individuals. The average household size was 2.70 and the average family size was 3.32. The median age was 36.5 years.

The median income for a household in the county was $44,776 and the median income for a family was $56,282. Males had a median income of $52,500 versus $28,306 for females. The per capita income for the county was $19,844. About 13.6% of families and 18.5% of the population were below the poverty line, including 24.7% of those under age 18 and 21.3% of those age 65 or over.

Politics
Rosebud County voters have selected the Republican Party candidate in 60% of national elections since 1980 (as of 2020).

Communities

Cities
 Colstrip
 Forsyth (county seat)

Census-designated places

 Ashland
 Birney
 Lame Deer
 Rosebud

Unincorporated communities

 Ahles
 Angela
 Bascom
 Carterville
 Hathaway
 Ingomar
 Jimtown
 Rock Springs
 Sumatra
 Thurlow

Former communities
 Vananda

Notable people
 Heather Sharfeddin – novelist, grew up in Rosebud County
 Frederic Remington (1861-1909) - famous western artist who lived at times, as late as 1901, on the Charles Boals ranch near Birney and the Cheyenne Indian Reservation where he hunted, painted and sketched.

See also
 List of lakes in Rosebud County, Montana
 List of mountains in Rosebud County, Montana
 National Register of Historic Places listings in Rosebud County, Montana

Footnotes

External links
 

 
1901 establishments in Montana
Populated places established in 1901